Yuri (Yury ) Alexandrovich Falik  (July 30, 1936, Odessa, USSR – January 23. 2009, Saint-Petersburg, Russia) was a Russian composer, orchestral conductor, cellist, a board member of the Leningrad (Saint-Petersburg) branch of the Composers' Union, and People's Artist of Russia.

Biography

Childhood and youth 
Yuri Falik was born into the family of orchestral musicians. His father Alexander Efimovich Falik played percussion in the Odessa Opera orchestra. His mother Yevgenia Mikhailovna also worked at the Odesa Opera and Ballet Theatre. In early childhood, Yuri Falik was often present at orchestra rehearsals and opera productions, easily memorizing and humming the music he heard. Yuri and his mother were evacuated to Kyrgyzstan during World War II. His father volunteered on the front lines of the war, and perished in 1942. The family tragedy and traumatic experiences of his early childhood strongly influenced not only Falik's personality but also his art. After returning to Odessa in 1944, he started to study cello under the guidance of his father's friend from the Odessa Opera House symphony orchestra, David Abramovich Mevzhinsky.

The following year, Falik entered his class at the famous Odessa Secondary Special Music Boarding School, beginning his systematic music education. At the age of 11, Falik began composing, often neglecting his schoolwork in favor of his new hobby. Soon he got his first mentor in composition, the composer Vladimir Afanasievich Shvets, who taught musical literature at the P. Stolyarsky School.

Quartet 
Falik had a special interest in quartets. In addition, as a cellist, he played in the school's academic quartet ensemble. In 1952, he organized his own quartet ensemble, which consisted of his schoolmates and friends. Along with classical works, the repertoire of this quartet included new works of the Soviet Union composers, as well as Falik's own compositions. According to his friend Adam Stratievsky, there were two youth quartets (1953 and 1954) written for the ensemble. The Quartet in e-moll (1954) was subsequently published by the Soviet Composer Publishing House in 1982 and was included in the list of the composer's works as the First Quartet. By the time he left school, Falik had composed a number of works, including quartets, works for an orchestra, choirs, romances, and a piano prelude. However, he decided to enter the performing faculty of the Leningrad Conservatory as a cellist.

Conservatory 
From 1955 till 1960, Falik studied at the Leningrad Conservatory in Professor Alexander Shtrimmer's cello class. He then pursued his postgraduate studies under Mstislav Rostropovich's guidance. He successfully started his performing career with his first solo concert in Leningrad in 1958. He then performed concert tours in Soviet cities. In 1962, Falik became a Diploma-winner of the Second International Tchaikovsky Competition, and a few months later he won the First prize in the International Cello Competition at the Eight World Festival of Youth and Students in Helsinki. Almost half a century later, in 2007, Falik took part in the Tchaikovsky Competition again, but as a jury member in the cello category.

Though he had a very busy life as a cellist, Falik never lost his desire to compose music, and in 1959 he was accepted to the composition class of the Conservatory first under Yuri Balkashin's guidance, then under Boris Arapov's. He graduated from the Conservatory as a composer in 1964, submitting the Symphony for String Orchestra and Percussion and the Quintet for Winds as his diploma works.

Stravinsky 
During this period, the young Falik had a significant meeting with composer Igor Stravinsky while he was touring in the USSR in 1962. Stravinsky had been his music idol since his childhood. Falik heard Stravinsky's music for the first time in his youth on a record brought by friends from abroad. He listened to Stravinsky's "Rite of Spring", which greatly impressed and inspired him. To Falik, it wasn't just luck, but a "sign of destiny" to get acquainted with Stravinsky at the Leningrad Philharmonic. Having heard that the young musician combined a professional performing career with composition, Stravinsky said: "It's impossible to combine: a cello is a very difficult instrument and takes a huge amount of time". The words sank deep into the young composer's soul, strengthening the long-cherished idea of treason to the cello. For the next several years, Falik devoted more and more time to composition even though he still continued to perform solo and as a member of chamber ensembles. In 1975, Falik expressed his piety for the Maestro in "Mourning Mass for Igor Stravinsky" ("Elegiac Music") for sixteen strings and four trombones, timed to coincide with the five-year anniversary of Stravinsky's death.

Career 

Falik's independent composer path started with the Second String Quartet (1965) dedicated to Yuri Balkashin's memory. This work clearly defined Falik's compositional personality. The Quartet was performed with great success by the Leningrad Taneiev Quartet in 1966 and was recommended for publication by the Leningrad Composers' Union. Considering this work a milestone, he arranged it for string orchestra and published it as "Music for Strings" in 1968.

Perhaps due to Stravinsky's influences, the next few years of Falik's career in composition were devoted to the ballet genre. Between 1966 and 1968, he created three ballets in collaboration with choreographer Georgy Aleksidze: "Buffoons" (a chamber ballet for four dancers to the similarly-named music of Falik's Concerto for Winds), "Thiel Ulenspiegel" (based on a Flemish legend), "Oresteia" (a choreographic tragedy after the work by Aeschylus). Aleksidze worked on libretto and choreography. He outlined the plan, action and atmosphere of a ballet and later developed dance movements in detail for the each phrase of Falik's music.

Only two of three ballets of the 1960s were staged. "Buffoons" was produced on the stage of the Leningrad Academic Cappella in 1967. "Oresteia" was staged during two seasons in Leningrad Kirov Opera and Ballet Theatre, then in Tbilisi (1973) and Estonia (1979). At Leningrad premiere production in 1969 Falik made his debut as a conductor on a big stage.

Despite the fact that the second ballet "Thiel Ulenspiegel" was never staged, its music is well known in Russia as the First Concerto for Symphony orchestra. The premiere of the Concert conducted by Dmitry Kitayenko took place in 1971, in Moscow. A similar fate befell the fourth planned ballet "Capriccios" based on F. Goya's works to a libretto by the artist Gavriil Glickman. The music of the failed ballet formed the basis for the Second Concerto for the orchestra "Symphonic Etudes" (1977), dedicated to G. Rozhdenstvensky. Thus, it was within the ballet genre that the composer's concertato style matured, quite clearly exposing the theatrical and playful nature of Falik's creative talent.

On the whole, the period of the 1970s became very fruitful for Falik in terms of searching his own style. At this time, he became renowned as a chamber-instrumental and an orchestral composer. Since 1966, Falik was a regular participant of the Leningrad Musical Spring Festival. In 1972, his First Concerto for symphony orchestra was performed at the Third International Festival "Prague Spring" by a Czechoslovak radio orchestra under conductor Eduard Serov. In 1977, Falik participated in the "Warsaw Autumn" with a Concerto for Violin and Orchestra (the violin part was performed by G. Zhislin).

The Violin Concerto (1971) marked the beginning of the period of creative maturity. A lyrical-philosophical concept of the Concerto is embodied on a new technique level: the five-movement composition consists of open parts following each other without interruption and provides the effect of continuous development of the principal intonation idea. Melodic material of the Concerto grows out of several simple tunes which are presented in the Introduction and pass evolving and varying through the whole cycle. The Concerto was dedicated to his friend Victor Lieberman and performed by him in Leningrad under conductor Alexander Dmitriev) with great success. In 1973, Falik received a positive review on The Violin Concerto from Dmitry Shostakovich, who congratulated Falik on his "excellent opus".

Falik and Shostakovich 
Despite the fact that Falik wasn't a student of Dmitri Shostakovich, he was strongly influenced by Shostakovich's personality and works, as were many young musicians of Falik's generation. Nevertheless, the young composer sought to avoid borrowing any elements of Shostakovich's musical language, as he mostly embraced the poetics of master's works, tragic spirit and deep psychological tension of his music. He dedicated the Fourth String Quartet, completed in 1976, to the memory of Shostakovich. The conversation that took place between Falik and Shostakovich in 1975, became an impulse to start working on this opus. Shostakovich noticed it is impossible to compose a joyful String Quartet. According to him, it was beyond anybody but Mozart. Falik sportingly undertook to refute this statement and promised Shostakovich to compose such a Quartet. The beginning of the work on the first movement in 1975 showed that the argument was already lost. Soon, tragic news of Shostakovich's death predetermined the mourning and memorial character of the second and the third movements of the Quartet. Instead of a joyful quartet it turned out to be a requiem. Without stylistic borrowings or quotations from Shostakovich's music Falik created a musical portrait of the Master, expressed personal thoughts and feelings, his own pain of the irreparable loss.

Choral music 
At the turn of the 1960-70s, Falik discovered a new field of work – music for choir a'cappella. Since 1969, choral cycles and separate compositions for choir appeared every year. Works of the 1970-80s, such as "Autumn Songs", "Two Solfeggio", "A Stranger Lady", "Winter Songs", Cant-vivat, "Estonian Watercolours" as well as three Concertos for choir a'cappella with lyrics of Silver Age Russian poets brought him a wide fame as a choral composer. He interprets choir in an unusual manner, so it quite often sounds like an orchestra or a chamber instrumental ensemble. Colorful harmony, metaphorical musical images, melodic and rhythmic virtuosity of chorus parts – all of these impart bright features of concertato style to the composer's choral music. At the same time, Falik appears as a lyricist and a fine connoisseur of poetry in this genre.

In 1990-1992 Falik completed the main part of "Liturgical Chants" based on the text of a Russian Orthodox prayer book. It became the most considerable amongst the choral works of those years and marked a watershed on his way, his own new Millennium. In his Interview with A. Yepishin in 2006 Falik recalled that his creative impulse for writing the choral cycle was provoked by the prayer book published in 1887, which he discovered in 1983 in the belongings of his deceased mother.

A few years later, in 1996, another sacred choral work appeared. American choirmaster Larry Сook, who heard "Liturgical Chants", suggested that Falik write a catholic Mass. Falik remembered, the Mass for soloists, chorus and chamber orchestra was written surprisingly quickly – in a month and a half. The premiere took place in St. Petersburg in 1997 (performed by the Choir of Youth under Yu. Khutoretskaya), then, in 1999, in America at St. John's Church of Youngstown city (USA, Ohio). Both premieres (Russian and American) were played under the composer's baton.

It should be noted the sacred theme matured over the previous two decades in his instrumental works such as the Third, Fourth, Fifth and Sixth Quartets, "Symphonic Etudes" (1977) etc. Musical language elements of these compositions refer to such Christian choral traditions as Znamenny chant, Gregorian chant, early forms of church polyphony. A focus on prototypes of the sacred genre sometimes can be "read" in titles of works or movements, for example, "Morning Mass for Igor Stravinsky" (1975), an orthodox funeral service, or the Second Movement "Requiem" of the Sixth String Quartet. Likewise, movements of the Concerto della Passione (1988) are titled "Lacrimosa", "Dies irae", "Libera me", "Lux aeterna". However, Falik doesn't seek to recreate the genre, treating prototypes generically as symbols of the spiritual human being.

"Polly" in America 
In the end of the 1980s the American producer Geraldine Freund set out to revive the genre of symphonic musical fairy tale for children, like Prokofiev's "Petya and the Wolf". She considered that only a Soviet composer should continue this tradition. On the advice of Vladimir Ovcharek, head of the Leningrad Taneyev Quartet, she addressed the proposal to Yu. Falik. "I was told that Falik is the only soviet composer who still writes melodies", Freund recalled. Falik accepted and soon, by August of 1989 full score of the musical fairy tale "Polly and Dinosaurs" for two narrators, children choir and symphony orchestra was completed. In the following year Falik was invited to America to conduct the Chicago Symphony Orchestra at the world premiere of his musical Fairy Tale. Followed by his family, Falik spent a week in Chicago, conducting orchestra and choir rehearsals, besides he lectured to composition students from Northwestern and De Paul universities and the University of Chicago (Illinois, USA). He returned to the Northwestern University as a visiting professor in 1991-1992.

Teaching 
In 1980, Falik became a senior lecturer at the Leningrad Conservatory. Since 1988, he worked there as a professor of composition and instrumentation. As a mentor of young composers, Falik realized that his task was not to push the talent, but to guide it in the right direction, by keeping a talented person "wrapped in cotton wool" from the beginning. He particularly focused on the issue of influence and imitation: in his opinion, a young composer should not be afraid of someone else's influence: "If your own nature is strong, it will gain strength and make its voice heard". However, it is necessary to be careful in choosing the object of imitation, to distinguish the "open" and "closed" types of composing style systems. The influence of an "open style system", such as Prokofiev's, Stravinsky's, or Schoenberg's works pose no danger for beginners. On the contrary, it is better, in his opinion, to avoid the influence of such composers as Shostakovich's and Rachmaninoff's "closed style systems".

Conducting 
For the first time, he picked up the conductor's baton, while a student of the Conservatory, when he had to record music for Lope de Vega's play "A Peasant Woman from Getafe" for Leningrad Film Studio.  A few years later he was entrusted with artistic direction of the Leningrad Conservatory's Student Chamber orchestra. Besides, he performed as a conductor all over Russia and abroad. During his American tour in the 1990s, his performances with the Chicago and Baltimore Symphony orchestras were highly appreciated by the press. Lists of his programs always included music of the 20th century, along with the venerable names of Stravinsky or Lutoslawski, he performed music of little-known and young Russian composers. As a conductor, Falik participated in the Second and Third World congresses of cellists (1997, Saint Petersburg, and 2000, Baltimore, respectively) under Mstislav Rostropovich's leadership.

Music and style 
The influences which formed his style include those of I. Stravinsky, P. Hindemith, A. Webern, B. Bartok, S. Prokofiev, N. Myaskovsky, W. Lutosławski and D. Shostakovich. But any influence was considered by him as a step on his path of self-education. Contemporary techniques of composition were not a dogma for him, he treated them selectively and interpreted them freely. After all, the technical design of his works (Falik called it an "engineering plan") was always as original and logically verified, as it was predetermined by the tasks of embodying an artistic concept. Thus, in the same work an expanded tonality and modal structures coexist with dodecaphony technique elements; melodic themes alternate with timbre and texture complexes-themes and colorful sonority; rigid, elastic and "gestural" rhythm is replaced with a free speech-recitation or chant-monody development of musical time. The intonation origins of his music are often rooted in the ancient layers of folk and professional music of the Russian, European and Jewish traditions. Archaic intonations, marked by his own style and placed in the stylistic context of music of the XX-XXI centuries, determine the sound image of the most significant compositions of the central and late works (such as Violin Concerto, String Quartets, Second and Third Symphonies, Elegiac Music, Symphony Etudes, Concerto della Passione, Mess, Liturgical Chant et.)

"A super master of every aspect of technique, he treats new methods selectively – only using them as his artistic concepts require. First, he searches for hidden resources in traditional genres and forms but foremost is the emergence of the idea, the conviction of the decision, the grasp of the intricacy of his musical development and the beauty of the sound"

Ekaterina Ruch'evskaya

Works 
Works for Music Theatre

"Oresteia" choreographic tragedy after the tragedy by Aeschylus (1968)
"The Impostures of Scapin" ("Plutni Skapena") opera-buffa after Moliere's comedy (1982)

Orchestral Works

Concertino for oboe and chamber orchestra (1961)
First Symphony for string orchestra and percussion (1963)
First Concerto for orchestra after the legends of Thiel Ulenspiegel (1967)
Music for Strings (1968)
Light Symphony (1971)
Concerto for Violin and Orchestra (1971)
"Morning Mass for Igor Stravinsky" ("Elegiac Music") for 4 trombones and 16 strings) (1975)
Second Concerto for orchestra ("Symphonic Etudes") (1977)
Chamber Concerto for three flutes (by one performer) and String Orchestra (1983)
Symphoniette for String Orchestra (1984)
Concertino for bassoon and string orchestra (1987)
Concerto della Passione for cello and symphony orchestra (1988)
Vivat, overture for Symphony orchestra (Vivat Chicago-Symphony) (1991)
Symphony No. 2 "Kaddish" (1993)
Lyric Concertino for viola and small symphony orchestra (for the day of Saint Petersburg) （1973, 2002）
Symphony No. 3 "Canto In Memoria" (2005)

Chamber Instrumental Works

Eight String Quartets (1954, 1965, 1974, 1976, 1978, 1984, 1993, 2001)
Trio for Oboe, Cello and Piano (1959)
Quintet for winds (1964)
"Buffoons" Concerto for wind and percussion (1966)
Partita for organ (1966)
Invention for Vibrophone, Marimba and 5 Tom-toms (1972)
Composition for Solo Violin (1975)
Toccata for Horn and Piano (1975)
English Divertissement for Flute, Clarinet and Bassoon (1978)
Composition for Cello Solo (1979)
Pastoral and Burlesque for flute and piano (1980)
Three pieces for Clarinet Solo (1983)
Introduction and Three Canzones, for flute, bassoon, violin, cello and piano (from the Opera Buffa "Plutni Skapena") (1995)
Retro-music for brass quintet (Brass quintet of the Chicago Symphony orchestra) (2 trumpets, French horn, trombone) (2003)

Piano Works

"Nadia's Tales", a piano cycle for youth (1969)
Children's Piano Album (10 pieces) (1974)
Five Preludes for piano (1982)
"Dedicated to Paganini", Invention and Chaconne for piano (1981)

Vocal-symphony Works

"A Solemn Song", cantata for soloist, choir and orchestra (1968)
"Praying Voice", chamber cantata for soprano and chamber orchestra based on poems by Anna Akhmatova (1978)
"Ringaday" ("Zveniden'") vocal-symphony cycle for mezzo-soprano and orchestra on lyrics by early XX century Russian poets (1986)
"Polly and Dinosaurs", musical fairy tale after the fairy tale by Jeraldin Freund for two narrators, children choir and symphony orchestra after the Fairy Tale by Geraldin Freund (1989)
Mass for soloists, choir and chamber orchestra (1996)
"Mannerheim", chamber cantata for mixed choir, clarinet, piano and percussion (2007)

Chamber Vocal Works

"World Songs", vocal cycle for Baritone and Piano (1961)
"A Half-fairy Tale" ("Poluskazki"), the Cycle of vocal miniatures on poems by Krivina, for baritone and piano (1965)
"The Sad Mother", lullabies for Mezzo and Piano, lyrics by Mistral (1972)
Five poems by Anna Akhmatova for Soprano and Piano (1972)
"Ringaday" ("Zveniden") Vocal Cycle for Mezzo-soprano and Orchestra (lyrics by early XXth century Russian poets (1980)"Beranger Songs" for Baritone and piano (1984)"…From lyrical Diary" for Tenor and Piano, lyrics by Soloukhin and Zhigulin (1985)Two songs for soprano and piano, lyrics by Maximovich translated by Akhmatova (1995)

Works for Choir a cappella"Triptich", Сhorus Сycle, lyrics by Soloukhin (1969)"Autumn Sons", Chorus Cycle, lyrics by Kedrin, Balmont, Nikitin, Zhigulin (1970)"Two solfeggio", Prelude and Fuga (1973),Cant-Vivat for Men's Choir, lyrics by Sumarokov (1974)"A Stranger Lady" ("Neznakomka"), lyrics by Block (1974)"A Harp", chorus poem, lyrics by Mejelaitis (1974)"Winter Sons", lyrics by Pasternak, Zabolotsiy, Zhigulin (1975)"Estonian Watercolours", Suite for Women's Choir, lyrics by Vaarandy, Lyiv (1976)"Poems by Igor Severianin", Concerto for Choir a cappella (1979)"The City sleeps" with lyrics by Blok (1980)"Karelian Watercolor" with lyrics by Vinonen (1980)"Prayer" with lyrics by Lermontov (1983)Doloroso (1983)"Ivan's Willow", with lyrics by Tarkovsky (1984)"Colorful Images", four miniatures for children's (women's) choir based on poems by Marshak, Mayakovsky, and Reznikova (1985)"Trinity", ("Troicyn den'"), Concerto for Choir a cappella, lyrics by Tsvetaeva (1987)"O, Nature!", Concerto for Choir a cappella, lyrics by Pasternak (1988),"Liturgical Chants" ("Liturgicheskie pesnopeniya"), the texts of the Russian orthodox "Prayer Book" ("Molitvoslov") (1990–1993)"Prayers", five Prayers for mixed Choir (1997)"Stanzas by Pushkin" Concerto for Choir a cappella (1998)"Ellegies", Сoncerto for soprano solo and choir a cappella, lyrics by Akhmatova and Gumilyov (2001)Four Сhoirs with lyrics by Arseny Tarkovsky, for Choir (and Flute) (2003)
 "Miraculous Faces" ("Pred Svyatye Ikony"), Cycle for mixed choir a cappella (2004)Four Russian songs for Women's Choir, with lyrics by Nikolai Klyuyev (2005)"Two prayers" ("Dva molitvosloviya") for Women's choir (2007)"Book of Canzons" Chorus Cycle in two parts, lyrics by European poets of the XI-XVII centuries (2007, 2008)"Prayer" for Chorus a cappella, lyrics by Solzhenitsyn (2009)
Music for Drama Theatre and Films"Pushkin's Tales" Leningrad Young Spectator Theatre , dir. by P. K. Veisbrem (1962)"A Peasant Woman from Getafe", the play by Lope de Vega/ Leningrad TV Studio, dir. by P. K. Veisbrem (1962)"Theme with Variations" Lenfilm, directed by Shapiro (1972)"The Near World, the Far World", Leningrad Science Film, dir. Zhvania (1974)"Five Years of Life" Moscow Central Science Film, dir. Burimsky (1976)

Editions, Arrangements, InstrumentationTwo fragments from J. Gershwin's Opera "Porgy and Bess": arrangement for Cello and Piano (1966)R. Plunkett "Cornevil's Bells": Editorial, recitatives, and instrumentation (1974)Borodin's "Prince Igor": editing and instrumentation (1993)Sher. Children's Concerto for violin and piano. Editing and instrumentation (2003)S. Joplin, G. Gershwin, O. Peterson: Transcriptions for string ensemble and piano (2003)

 Bibliography 

 Mikhail Galushko (1986) Obrashchayas' k Mol'yeru [Turning to Moliere] // Sovetskaya Musika – Soviet Music, no. 4, pp. 36–40 (in Russian)
 Anna Gorn (2020) Balety Yu. Falika: zhanrovye vzaimodejstviya i muzykal'no-dramaticheskie idei [Yu. Falik's Ballets: Genre Interaction and Musical-dramatic Ideas] //Vestnik Akademii russkogo baleta - Bulletin of the Vaganova Ballet Academy's, no. 3, pp. 85–98.
 Arkady Klimovitsky (ed.) (1994) Yuri Falik. Shtrihi k tvorcheskomu portretu [Yuri Falik. Touches to the Creative Portrait]. In: Kompository Rossijskoj Federacii - Composers of Russian Federation, Issue 5. Moscow: Kompozitor Publ., pp. 279 – 317 (in Russian)
 Arkady Klimovitsky Falik, Yuri Aleksandrovich//Grove Dictionary Online. Available from: https://doi.org/10.1093/gmo/9781561592630.article.09261
 Andrey Kovalyov (2017) "Liturgicheskie Pesnopeniya" Yuriya Falika: problema tsiklichnosti [Yuri Falik's "Liturgical Chant": Cyclicality Issue] //Observatoria kulturi / Observatory of Culture, 14, no. 4. Available from: [https://elibrary.ru/item.asp?id=30013959] [Accessed 15.07.20] (in Russian)
 Metamorphozi. Yuri Falik: violonchelist, kompozitor, dirizher, pedagog. Dialogi s kompozitorom [Metamorphoses. Yuri Falik: Cellist, Composer, Conductor, Teacher. Dialogues with the Composer] (2010). St. Petersburg: Kompozitor-Sankt-Peterburg Publ., 366 p. (in Russian)
 Iosif Raiskin (2009). Chistaya nota [Pure Tone] // Musikalnaya Akademiya – Music Academy, no. 4, pp. 108–110. Available from: https://www.elibrary.ru/item.asp?id=13031596 [Accessed 30.07.20] (in Russian)
 Ekaterina Ruch'evskaya (1981) Yuri Falik. Leningrad: Sovetsky Kompozitor Publ., 104 p. (in Russian)
 Ekaterina Ruch'evskaya (1995). Yuri Falik. St. Petersburg: Soyuz Kompozitorov Publ. [in Russin / in English]
 Ekaterina Ruch'evskaya (2011) Simphonicheskoe tvorchestvo Yuriya Falika [Yu. Falik's Symphonic Works]. In: Ruchievskaya E. A. Works of Different Years: V. 1. Articles, notes, memories. St. Petersburg. Kompozitor-St. Peterburg Publ., pp. 211–270. (in Russian)
 Sergey Sigitov (1996) Beseda s Yuriem Falikom [Conversation with Yuri Falik] //Mariinskij teatr – Mariinskii Opera House, no. 5-6, p. 6 (in Russian)
 Adam Stratievsky (ed.) (1973) Kompozitor Yuri Falik: shtrikhi tvorcheskogo portreta [Falik: features of the creative portrait]. Muzïka i zhizn' - Music and Life, Issue 3. Leningrad - Moscow. pp. 20–39 (in Russian)
 Adam Stratievsky (ed.) (2016) O kvartetah Yuria Falika [About Quartets of Yuri Falik]. In: Adam Solomonovich Stratievsky: Kniga pamyati - Adam Solomonovich Stratievsky: Memory Book (ed.) (2016). St. Petersburg: Art- Express Publ., pp. 270–348. Available from:  [Accessed 19.07.20] (in Russian)
 Olga Tarasova (2009) Horovoe tvorchestvo Yuriya Falika. Diss. kand. iskusstvovedeniya [Yuri Falik's Choral Works. Extended Abstract of Ph.D. Thesis of Art Criticism]. Nizhnij Novgorod: N. Novgorod State Conservatory, 25 p. Available from:  [Accessed 15.07.20] (in Russian)
 Yu. Falik: "Nuzhno vernut' russkij fol'klor v pravoslavnuyu muzyku" [Yuri Falik: "It is necessary to return Russian folklore to Orthodox music"] (ed.) (2012). In: Muzykal'nyj mir v novom tysyacheletii: vzglyad iz Peterburga [The Musical World in the New Millennium: a View from St. Petersburg], part 1. Interv'yu s kompozitorami/ ed. by Andrey Epishin. St. Petersburg: Kompozitor-Sankt-Petersburg Publ., pp. 94–102 (in Russian)
 John von Rhein (1990) Staging a Pet Project //Chicago Tribune'', March 4. Available from:  [Accessed 15/07/20] John von Rhein''' (1990) Available from:  Fantasy comes to Life in `Polly and the Dinosaurs`// Chicago Tribune, March 5. [Accessed 15.07.20].

Awards 
 Honored Artists of the Russian Federation (1981)
 Golden [Medal of Pushkin] (1999)  
 People's Artist of Russia (2002)

References

External links 
 Catalog of Yuri Falik's published works by the St.-Petersburg Publish House "Kompozitor - St. Petersburg"
 Audio recordings of Yuri Falik's works
 Video recordings of Yury Falik's works

1936 births
2009 deaths
Russian composers
Russian conductors (music)
Russian male conductors (music)
Russian cellists
People's Artists of Russia
Academic staff of Saint Petersburg Conservatory
Recipients of the Medal of Pushkin
Soviet music educators
Soviet composers
Soviet conductors (music)
Saint Petersburg Conservatory alumni
Musicians from Odesa
20th-century cellists